John Robbins (1808April 27, 1880) was a Democratic member of the U.S. House of Representatives from Pennsylvania.

Early life and career
John Robbins was born in Bustleton, Pennsylvania, (now a part of Philadelphia), near Lower Dublin Township, Pennsylvania.  He was a student at the Gunmere Academy in Burlington, New Jersey.  He moved to Philadelphia in 1836 and engaged in the manufacture of steel.  He was a member of the board of commissioners of the district of Kensington, Pennsylvania, and served as president several years.

Political career
Robbins was elected as a Democrat to the Thirty-first, Thirty-second congresses, representing the fourth district of Pennsylvania from March 4, 1849 to March 3, 1853; and to the Thirty-third Congress representing the third district from March 4, 1853 to March 3, 1855.  He declined to be a candidate for renomination in 1854, and was an unsuccessful candidate for the office of the Mayor of Philadelphia in 1860. He resumed the steel manufacturing business and held several municipal offices.

Again elected to the Forty-fourth Congress, for the fifth district, Robbins served from March 4, 1875, to March 3, 1877; but declined to be a candidate for renomination in 1876.

Later life and death

Robbins was a member of the board of education and served as president for many years, as well as president and director of the Kensington National Bank.  He died in Philadelphia, Pennsylvania, on April 27, 1880 and was interred at Laurel Hill Cemetery.

References

External links

John Robbins entry at The Political Graveyard

1808 births
1880 deaths
American steel industry businesspeople
Politicians from Philadelphia
School board members in Pennsylvania
Democratic Party members of the United States House of Representatives from Pennsylvania
Burials at Laurel Hill Cemetery (Philadelphia)
19th-century American politicians
19th-century American businesspeople